Cicindela scutellaris, the festive tiger beetle, is a species of flashy tiger beetle in the family Carabidae. It is found in North America.

Subspecies
These seven subspecies belong to the species Cicindela scutellaris:
 Cicindela scutellaris flavoviridis Vaurie, 1950 (chartreuse tiger beetle)
 Cicindela scutellaris lecontei Haldeman, 1853 (Leconte's tiger beetle)
 Cicindela scutellaris rugata Vaurie, 1950 (rugate tiger beetle)
 Cicindela scutellaris rugifrons Dejean, 1825 (festive tiger beetle)
 Cicindela scutellaris scutellaris Say, 1823 (festive tiger beetle)
 Cicindela scutellaris unicolor Dejean, 1825 (unicolored tiger beetle)
 Cicindela scutellaris yampae Rumpp, 1986 (yampa tiger beetle)

References

Further reading

External links

 

scutellaris
Articles created by Qbugbot
Beetles described in 1823